Pentaphenylphosphorus is an organic phosphorane containing five phenyl groups connected to a central phosphorus atom. The phosphorus atom is considered to be in the +5 oxidation state. The chemical formula could be written as P(C6H5)5 or Ph5P, where Ph represents the phenyl group. It was discovered and reported in 1949 by Georg Wittig.

Formation
Pentaphenylphosphorus can be formed by the action of phenyllithium on tetraphenylphosphonium bromide or tetraphenylphosphonium iodide.

Properties
In the solid form of pure pentaphenylphosphorus, molecules have a trigonal bipyramid shape. The crystal structure of the pure form is monoclinic with a=10.03, b=17.22 c=14.17 Å and β=112.0°. The unit cell volume is 2267.5 Å3. There are four of the formula per unit cell (Z=4). Space group is Cc. Pentaphenyl phosphorus can also crystallise with some of the solvent, (to form a solvate).
With tetrahydrofuran, the crystal structure of which is triclinic, with space group P, with unit cell dimensions a=10.095 b=10.252 c=12.725 Å α=71.21, β=76.98, γ=87.12 with Z=2. It can also form a solvate crystal with cyclohexane or benzene.

Reactions
On heating, pentaphenylphosphorus decomposes to form biphenyl and triphenylphosphine.

Pentaphenylphosphorus reacts with acidic hydrogen to yield the tetraphenylphosphonium ion and benzene. For example pentaphenylphosphorus reacts with carboxylic acids and sulfonic acids to yield the tetraphenylphosphonium salt of the carboxylate or sulfonate, and benzene.

Pentaphenylphosphorus transfers a phenyl group to organomercury, and tin halides. For example pentaphenylphosphorus reacts with phenylmercury chloride to yield diphenyl mercury and tetraphenylphosphonium chloride. With tributyltin chloride, tributylphenyltin is produced. However the pentaphenylphosphorus reaction with triphenylbismuth difluoride, chloride or bromide makes triphenylbismuth and fluorobenzene, chlorobenzene or bromobenzene. This is probably because tetraphenylbismuth halides (Ph4BiF, Ph4BiCl, Ph4BiBr) spontaneously decompose as the halogen reacts with one phenyl group.

When heated with carbon dioxide or sulfur, bicyclic compounds are formed, where the reactant bridges between one of the phenyl groups and the phosphorus.

References

Extra reading

Phosphorus(V) compounds
Phenyl compounds
Substances discovered in the 1940s